The 1967 season of the Venezuelan Primera División, the top category of Venezuelan football, was played by 9 teams. The national champions were Deportivo Portugués.

Results

Standings

External links
Venezuela 1967 season at RSSSF

Ven
1967 in Venezuelan sport
Venezuelan Primera División seasons